Panentheism ("all in God", from the Greek ,  and ) is the belief that the divine intersects every part of the universe and also extends beyond space and time. The term was coined by the German philosopher Karl Krause in 1828 to distinguish the ideas of Georg Wilhelm Friedrich Hegel (1770–1831) and Friedrich Wilhelm Joseph Schelling (1775–1854) about the relation of God and the universe from the supposed pantheism of Baruch Spinoza, after reviewing Hindu scriptures. Unlike pantheism, which holds that the divine and the universe are identical, panentheism maintains an ontological distinction between the divine and the non-divine and the significance of both.

In panentheism, the universal spirit is present everywhere, which at the same time "transcends" all things created. While pantheism asserts that "all is God", panentheism claims that God is greater than the universe. Some versions of panentheism suggest that the universe is nothing more than the manifestation of God. In addition, some forms indicate that the universe is contained within God, like in the Kabbalah concept of tzimtzum. Much of Hindu thought is highly characterized by panentheism and pantheism.

In philosophy

Ancient Greek philosophy 

The religious beliefs of Neoplatonism can be regarded as panentheistic. Plotinus taught that there was an ineffable transcendent God ("the One", to En, τὸ Ἕν) of which subsequent realities were emanations. From "the One" emanates the Divine Mind (Nous, Νοῦς) and the Cosmic Soul (Psyche, Ψυχή). In Neoplatonism the world itself is God (according to Plato's Timaeus 37). This concept of divinity is associated with that of the Logos (Λόγος), which had originated centuries earlier with Heraclitus (c. 535–475 BC). The Logos pervades the cosmos, whereby all thoughts and all things originate, or as Heraclitus said: "He who hears not me but the Logos will say: All is one." Neoplatonists such as Iamblichus attempted to reconcile this perspective by adding another hypostasis above the original monad of force or Dunamis (Δύναμις). This new all-pervasive monad encompassed all creation and its original uncreated emanations.

Modern philosophy 
Baruch Spinoza later claimed that "Whatsoever is, is in God, and without God nothing can be, or be conceived." "Individual things are nothing but modifications of the attributes of God, or modes by which the attributes of God are expressed in a fixed and definite manner." Though Spinoza has been called the "prophet" and "prince" of pantheism, in a letter to Henry Oldenburg Spinoza states that: "as to the view of certain people that I identify god with nature (taken as a kind of mass or corporeal matter), they are quite mistaken". For Spinoza, our universe (cosmos) is a mode under two attributes of Thought and Extension. God has infinitely many other attributes which are not present in our world.

According to German philosopher Karl Jaspers, when Spinoza wrote "Deus sive Natura" (God or Nature) Spinoza did not mean to say that God and Nature are interchangeable terms, but rather that God's transcendence was attested by his infinitely many attributes, and that two attributes known by humans, namely Thought and Extension, signified God's immanence. Furthermore, Martial Guéroult suggested the term panentheism, rather than pantheism to describe Spinoza's view of the relation between God and the world. The world is not God, but it is, in a strong sense, "in" God. Yet, American philosopher and self-described panentheist Charles Hartshorne referred to Spinoza's philosophy as "classical pantheism" and distinguished Spinoza's philosophy from panentheism.

In 1828, the German philosopher Karl Christian Friedrich Krause (1781–1832) seeking to reconcile monotheism and pantheism, coined the term panentheism (from the Ancient Greek expression πᾶν ἐν θεῷ, pān en theṓ, literally "all in god"). This conception of God influenced New England transcendentalists such as Ralph Waldo Emerson. The term was popularized by Charles Hartshorne in his development of process theology and has also been closely identified with the New Thought.  The formalization of this term in the West in the 19th century was not new; philosophical treatises had been written on it in the context of Hinduism for millennia.

Philosophers who embraced panentheism have included Thomas Hill Green (1839–1882), James Ward (1843–1925), Andrew Seth Pringle-Pattison (1856–1931) and Samuel Alexander (1859–1938). Beginning in the 1940s, Hartshorne examined numerous conceptions of God. He reviewed and discarded pantheism, deism, and pandeism in favor of panentheism, finding that such a "doctrine contains all of deism and pandeism except their arbitrary negations". Hartshorne formulated God as a being who could become "more perfect": He has absolute perfection in categories for which absolute perfection is possible, and relative perfection (i. e., is superior to all others) in categories for which perfection cannot be precisely determined.

In religion

Buddhism 

The Reverend Zen Master Soyen Shaku was the first Zen Buddhist Abbot to tour the United States in 1905–6. He wrote a series of essays collected into the book Zen For Americans.  In the essay titled "The God Conception of Buddhism" he attempts to explain how a Buddhist looks at the ultimate without an anthropomorphic God figure while still being able to relate to the term God in a Buddhist sense:

At the outset, let me state that Buddhism is not atheistic as the term is ordinarily understood. It has certainly a God, the highest reality and truth, through which and in which this universe exists. However, the followers of Buddhism usually avoid the term God, for it savors so much of Christianity, whose spirit is not always exactly in accord with the Buddhist interpretation of religious experience. Again, Buddhism is not pantheistic in the sense that it identifies the universe with God. On the other hand, the Buddhist God is absolute and transcendent; this world, being merely its manifestation, is necessarily fragmental and imperfect. To define more exactly the Buddhist notion of the highest being, it may be convenient to borrow the term very happily coined by a modern German scholar, "panentheism," according to which God is πᾶν καὶ ἕν (all and one) and more than the totality of existence.[a]

The essay then goes on to explain first utilizing the term "God" for the American audience to get an initial understanding of what he means by "panentheism," and then discusses the terms that Buddhism uses in place of "God" such as Dharmakaya, Buddha or Adi-Buddha, and Tathagata.

Christianity 

Panentheism is also a feature of some Christian philosophical theologies and resonates strongly within the theological tradition of the Eastern Orthodox Church. It also appears in process theology. Process theological thinkers are generally regarded in the Christian West as unorthodox. Furthermore, process philosophical thought is widely believed to have paved the way for open theism, a movement that tends to associate itself primarily with the Evangelical branch of Protestantism, but is also generally considered unorthodox by most Evangelicals.

Catholic panentheism
A number of ordained Catholic mystics (including Richard Rohr, David Steindl-Rast, and Thomas Keating) have suggested that panentheism is the original view of Christianity. They hold that such a view is directly supported by mystical experience and the teachings of Jesus and Saint Paul. Richard Rohr surmises this in his 2019 book, The Universal Christ:

Similarly, David Steindl-Rast posits that Christianity's original panentheism is being revealed through contemporary mystical insight:

 This sentiment is mirrored in Thomas Keating's 1993 article, Clarifications Regarding Centering Prayer:

Panentheism in other Christian confessions 
Panentheistic conceptions of God occur amongst some modern theologians. Process theology and Creation Spirituality, two recent developments in Christian theology, contain panentheistic ideas. Charles Hartshorne (1897–2000), who conjoined process theology with panentheism, maintained a lifelong membership in the Methodist church but was also a Unitarian. In later years he joined the Austin, Texas, Unitarian Universalist congregation and was an active participant in that church. Referring to the ideas such as Thomas Oord's ‘theocosmocentrism’ (2010), the soft panentheism of open theism, Keith Ward's comparative theology and John Polkinghorne's critical realism (2009), Raymond Potgieter observes distinctions such as dipolar and bipolar:

The former suggests two poles separated such as God influencing creation and it in turn its creator (Bangert 2006:168), whereas bipolarity completes God’s being implying interdependence between temporal and eternal poles. (Marbaniang 2011:133), in dealing with Whitehead’s approach, does not make this distinction. I use the term bipolar as a generic term to include suggestions of the structural definition of God’s transcendence and immanence; to for instance accommodate a present and future reality into which deity must reasonably fit and function, and yet maintain separation from this world and evil whilst remaining within it.

Some argue that panentheism should also include the notion that God has always been related to some world or another, which denies the idea of creation out of nothing (creatio ex nihilo). Nazarene Methodist theologian Thomas Jay Oord (* 1965) advocates panentheism, but he uses the word "theocosmocentrism" to highlight the notion that God and some world or another are the primary conceptual starting blocks for eminently fruitful theology. This form of panentheism helps in overcoming the problem of evil and in proposing that God's love for the world is essential to who God is.

The Latter Day Saint movement teaches that the Light of Christ "proceeds from God through Christ and gives life and light to all things".

Gnosticism 

Manichaeists, being of another gnostic sect, preached a very different doctrine in positioning the true Manichaean God against matter as well as other deities, that it described as enmeshed with the world, namely the gods of Jews, Christians and pagans. Nevertheless, this dualistic teaching included an elaborate cosmological myth that narrates the defeat of primal man by the powers of darkness that devoured and imprisoned the particles of light.

Valentinian Gnosticism taught that matter came about through emanations of the supreme being, even if to some this event is held to be more accidental than intentional. To other gnostics, these emanations were akin to the Sephirot of the Kabbalists and deliberate manifestations of a transcendent God through a complex system of intermediaries.

Hinduism 
The earliest reference to panentheistic thought in Hindu philosophy is in a creation myth contained in the later section of Rig Veda called the Purusha Sukta, which was compiled before 1100 BCE. The Purusha Sukta gives a description of the spiritual unity of the cosmos. It presents the nature of Purusha or the cosmic being as both immanent in the manifested world and yet transcendent to it. From this being the sukta holds, the original creative will proceeds, by which this vast universe is projected in space and time.

The most influential and dominant school of Indian philosophy, Advaita Vedanta, rejects theism and dualism by insisting that "Brahman [ultimate reality] is without parts or attributes...one without a second."  Since Brahman has no properties, contains no internal diversity and is identical with the whole reality it cannot be understood as an anthropomorphic personal God. The relationship between Brahman and the creation is often thought to be panentheistic.

Panentheism is also expressed in the Bhagavad Gita. In verse IX.4, Krishna states: 

Many schools of Hindu thought espouse monistic theism, which is thought to be similar to a panentheistic viewpoint. Nimbarka's school of differential monism (Dvaitadvaita), Ramanuja's school of qualified monism (Vishistadvaita) and Saiva Siddhanta and Kashmir Shaivism are all considered to be panentheistic. Chaitanya Mahaprabhu's Gaudiya Vaishnavism, which elucidates the doctrine of Achintya Bheda Abheda (inconceivable oneness and difference), is also thought to be panentheistic. In Kashmir Shaivism, all things are believed to be a manifestation of Universal Consciousness (Cit or Brahman). So from the point of view of this school, the phenomenal world (Śakti) is real, and it exists and has its being in Consciousness (Ćit). Thus, Kashmir Shaivism is also propounding of theistic monism or panentheism.

Shaktism, or Tantra, is regarded as an Indian prototype of Panentheism. Shakti is considered to be the cosmos itself – she is the embodiment of energy and dynamism, and the motivating force behind all action and existence in the material universe. Shiva is her transcendent masculine aspect, providing the divine ground of all being. "There is no Shiva without Shakti, or Shakti without Shiva. The two ... in themselves are One." Thus, it is She who becomes the time and space, the cosmos, it is She who becomes the five elements, and thus all animate life and inanimate forms. She is the primordial energy that holds all creation and destruction, all cycles of birth and death, all laws of cause and effect within Herself, and yet is greater than the sum total of all these. She is transcendent, but becomes immanent as the cosmos (Mula Prakriti). She, the Primordial Energy, directly becomes Matter.

Judaism 
While mainstream Rabbinic Judaism is classically monotheistic, and follows in the footsteps of Maimonides (c. 1135–1204), the panentheistic conception of God can be found among certain mystical Jewish traditions. A leading scholar of Kabbalah, Moshe Idel ascribes this doctrine to the kabbalistic system of Moses ben Jacob Cordovero (1522–1570) and in the eighteenth century to the Baal Shem Tov (c. 1700–1760), founder of the Hasidic movement, as well as his contemporaries, Rabbi Dov Ber, the Maggid of Mezeritch (died 1772), and Menahem Mendel, the Maggid of Bar. This may be said of many, if not most, subsequent Hasidic masters. There is some debate as to whether Isaac Luria (1534–1572) and Lurianic Kabbalah, with its doctrine of tzimtzum, can be regarded as panentheistic.

According to Hasidism, the infinite Ein Sof is incorporeal and exists in a state that is both transcendent and immanent. This appears to be the view of non-Hasidic Rabbi Chaim of Volozhin, as well. Hasidic Judaism merges the elite ideal of nullification to a transcendent God, via the intellectual articulation of inner dimensions through Kabbalah and with emphasis on the panentheistic divine immanence in everything.

Many scholars would argue that "panentheism" is the best single-word description of the philosophical theology of Baruch Spinoza. It is therefore no surprise, that aspects of panentheism are also evident in the theology of Reconstructionist Judaism as presented in the writings of Mordecai Kaplan (1881–1983), who was strongly influenced by Spinoza.

Sikhism 

Many newer, contemporary Sikhs have suggested that human souls and the monotheistic God are two different realities (dualism), distinguishing it from the monistic and various shades of nondualistic philosophies of other Indian religions. However, Sikh scholars have explored nondualism exegesis of Sikh scriptures, such as Bhai Vir Singh. According to Mandair, Singh interprets the Sikh scriptures as teaching nonduality. The renowned Sikh Scholar, Bhai Mani Singh, is quoted to saying that Sikhism has all the essence of Vedanta Philosophy. Historically, the Sikh symbol of Ik Oankaar has had a monist meaning, and has been reduced to simply meaning, "There is but One God", which is incorrect. Older exegesis of Sikh scripture, such as the Faridkot Teeka, and Garab Ganjani Teeka has always described Sikh Metaphysics as a non-dual, panentheistic universe. For this reason, Sikh Metaphysics has often been compared to the Non-Dual, Vedanta metaphysics. The Sikh Poet, Bhai Nand Lal, often used Sufi terms to describe Sikh philosophy, talking about wahdat ul-wujud in his persian poetry.

Islam 

Several Sufi saints and thinkers, primarily Ibn Arabi, held beliefs that have been considered somewhat panentheistic. These notions later took shape in the theory of wahdat ul-wujud (the Unity of All Things). Some Sufi Orders, notably the Bektashis and the Universal Sufi movement, continue to espouse panentheistic beliefs. Nizari Ismaili follow panentheism according to Ismaili doctrine. Nevertheless, some Shia Muslims also do believe in different degrees of Panentheism.

Al-Qayyuum is a Name of God in the Qur'an which translates to "The Self-Existing by Whom all subsist". In Islam the universe can not exist if Allah doesn't exist, and it is only by His power which encompasses everything and which is everywhere that the universe can exist. In Ayaẗ al-Kursii God's throne is described as "extending over the heavens and the earth" and "He feels no fatigue in guarding and preserving them". This does not mean though that the universe is God, or that a creature (like a tree or an animal) is God, because those would be respectively pantheism, which is a heresy in traditional Islam, and the worst heresy in Islam, shirk (polytheism). God is separated by His creation but His creation can not survive without Him.

In Pre-Columbian America 
The Mesoamerican empires of the Mayas, Aztecs as well as the South American Incas (Tahuatinsuyu) have typically been characterized as polytheistic, with strong male and female deities. According to Charles C. Mann's history book 1491: New Revelations of the Americas Before Columbus, only the lower classes of Aztec society were polytheistic. Philosopher James Maffie has argued that Aztec metaphysics was pantheistic rather than panentheistic, since Teotl was considered by Aztec philosophers to be the ultimate all-encompassing yet all-transcending force defined by its inherit duality.

Native American beliefs in North America have been characterized as panentheistic in that there is an emphasis on a single, unified divine spirit that is manifest in each individual entity. (North American Native writers have also translated the word for God as the Great Mystery or as the Sacred Other). This concept is referred to by many as the Great Spirit. Philosopher J. Baird Callicott has described Lakota theology as panentheistic, in that the divine both transcends and is immanent in everything.

One exception can be modern Cherokee who are predominantly monotheistic but apparently not panentheistic; yet in older Cherokee traditions many observe both aspects of pantheism and panentheism, and are often not beholden to exclusivity, encompassing other spiritual traditions without contradiction, a common trait among some tribes in the Americas. In the stories of Keetoowah storytellers Sequoyah Guess and Dennis Sixkiller, God is known as ᎤᏁᎳᏅᎯ, commonly pronounced "unehlanv," and visited earth in prehistoric times, but then left earth and her people to rely on themselves. This shows a parallel to Vaishnava cosmology.

Konkōkyō 
Konkokyo is a form of sectarian Japanese Shinto, and a faith within the Shinbutsu-shūgō tradition. Traditional Shintoism holds that an impersonal spirit manifests/penetrates the material world, giving all objects consciousness and spontaneously creating a system of natural mechanisms, forces, and phenomena (Musubi). Konkokyo deviates from traditional Shintoism by holding that this spirit (Comparable to Brahman), has a personal identity and mind. This personal form is non-different from the energy itself, not residing in any particular cosmological location. In Konkokyo, this god is named "Tenchi Kane no Kami-Sama" which can be translated directly as, "Spirit of the gilded/golden heavens and earth".

Though practitioners of Konkokyo are small in number (~300,000 globally), the sect has birthed or influenced a multiplicity of Japanese New Religions, such as Oomoto. Many of these faiths carry on the Panentheistic views of Konkokyo

See also

Achintya Bheda Abheda, concept of qualified non-duality in Gaudiya Vaishnava Hinduism
Brahman
Christian Universalism
Conceptions of God
Creation Spirituality
Divine simplicity
Double-aspect theory
Essence–energies distinction
German idealism
Henosis
Kabbalah
Neoplatonism
Neutral monism
Open theism
The Over-Soul (1841), essay by Ralph Waldo Emerson
Orthodox Christian theology
Pantheism
Pandeism
Parabrahman
Paramatman
Philosophy of space and time
Process theology
Subud, spiritual movement founded by Muhammad Subuh Sumohadiwidjojo (1901–1987)
Tawhid, concept of indivisible oneness in Islam

 People associated with panentheism

Gregory Palamas (1296–1359), Byzantine Orthodox theologian and hesychast
Baruch Spinoza (1632–1677), Dutch philosopher of Sephardi-Portuguese origin
Alfred North Whitehead (1861–1947), English mathematician, philosopher, and father of process philosophy
Charles Hartshorne (1897–2000), American philosopher and father of process theology
Arthur Peacocke (1924–2006), British Anglican theologian and biochemist
John B. Cobb (b. 1925), American theologian and philosopher
Mordechai Nessyahu (1929–1997), Jewish-Israeli political theorist and philosopher of Cosmotheism
Sallie McFague (1933–2019), American feminist theologian, author of Models of God and The Body of God
William Luther Pierce (1933–2002), American political activist and self-proclaimed cosmotheist
Rosemary Radford Ruether (b. 1936), American feminist theologian, author of Sexism and God-Talk and Gaia and God
Jan Assmann (b. 1938), German Egyptologist, theorist of Cosmotheism
Leonardo Boff (b. 1938), Brazilian liberation theologian and philosopher, former Franciscan priest, author of Ecology and Liberation: A New Paradigm
Matthew Fox (priest) (b. 1940), American theologian, exponent of Creation Spirtuality, expelled from the Dominican Order in 1993 and received into the Episcopal priesthood in 1994, author of Creation Spirituality, The Coming of the Cosmic Christ and A New Reformation: Creation Spirituality and the Transformation of Christianity
Marcus Borg (1942–2015), American New Testament scholar and theologian, prominent member of the Jesus Seminar, author of The God We Never Knew
Richard Rohr (b. 1943), American Franciscan priest and spiritual writer, author of Everything Belongs and The Universal Christ
Carter Heyward (b. 1945), American feminist theologian and Episcopal priest, author of Touching our Strength and Saving Jesus from Those Who Are Right
Norman Lowell (b. 1946), Maltese writer and politician, self-proclaimed cosmotheist
John Polkinghorne (b. 1960), English theoretical physicist and theologian
Michel Weber (b. 1963), Belgian philosopher
Thomas Jay Oord (b. 1965), American theologian and philosopher

Citations

General and cited references 
 Ankur Barua, "God’s Body at Work: Rāmānuja and Panentheism," in: International Journal of Hindu Studies, 14.1 (2010), pp. 1–30.
 Philip Clayton and Arthur Peacock (eds.), In Whom We Live and Move and Have Our Being; Panentheistic Reflections on God's Presence in a Scientific World, Eerdmans (2004)
 Bangert, B.C. (2006). Consenting to God and nature: Toward a theocentric, naturalistic, theological ethics, Princeton theological monograph ser. 55, Pickwick Publications, Eugene.
 Cooper, John W. (2006). Panentheism: The Other God of the Philosophers, Baker Academic 
 Davis, Andrew M. and Philip Clayton (eds.) (2018). How I Found God in Everyone and Everywhere, Monkfish Book Publishing 
 Thomas Jay Oord (2010). The Nature of Love: A Theology .
 Joseph Bracken, "Panentheism in the context of the theology and science dialogue", in: Open Theology, 1 (2014), 1–11 (online).

External links

 

 Dr. Jay McDaniel on Panentheism 
 Biblical Panentheism: The “Everywhere-ness” of God—God in all things, by Jon Zuck 

 John Polkinghorne on Panentheism
 The Bible, Spiritual authority and Inspiration – Lecture by Tom Wright at Spiritual Minded

 
Christian universalism
Kabbalah